Willy Braciano Ta Bi (5 December 1999 – 23 February 2021) was an Ivorian professional footballer who played as a defensive midfielder. He made one senior appearance for the Ivory Coast national team in 2017.

Club career
Born in Divo, Ta Bi played club football for Moossou, ASEC Mimosas and Atalanta.

International career 
Ta Bi made one appearance for the Ivory Coast senior team in 2017, and also represented them at under-17 and under-20 levels. He captained the national youth team and appeared at the 2017 Francophone Games.

Death 
Ta Bi died on 23 February 2021, aged 21, from liver cancer.

References

1999 births
2021 deaths
Ivorian footballers
Moossou FC players
ASEC Mimosas players
Atalanta B.C. players
Association football midfielders
Ivorian expatriate footballers
Place of death missing
Ivorian expatriates in Italy
Expatriate footballers in Italy
Ivory Coast under-20 international footballers
Ivory Coast international footballers
Deaths from liver cancer
Deaths from cancer in Italy
People from Divo, Ivory Coast